A canticle is a hymn, psalm or other song of praise taken from biblical or holy texts other than the Psalms.

Canticle or canticles may also refer to:

 Canticle, a book in The Cleric Quintet by R. A. Salvatore
 Canticle, a 2009 book by Ken Scholes in the Psalms of Isaak series
 "Scarborough Fair/Canticle", a 1968 setting by Simon & Garfunkel
 Canticles, another name for the Song of Songs (Song of Solomon)
 Canticles (Britten), a series of five musical works by Benjamin Britten

See also

 A Canticle for Leibowitz, 1960 novel by Walter M. Miller, Jr.